Noi siamo due evasi is a 1959 Italian crime-comedy film directed by Giorgio Simonelli.

Cast 

 Ugo Tognazzi: Bernardo Cesarotti 
 Magali Noël: Odette 
 Raimondo Vianello: Camillo Gorini 
 Sandra Mondaini: Isabella 
 Titina De Filippo: Baroness Holz 
 Irène Tunc: Silvia 
 Maurizio Arena:  Francesco Curti 
 Mirko Ellis: Philippe 
 Fred Buscaglione: Himself
 José Jaspe 
 Olimpia Cavalli 
 José Calvo

References

External links

1959 films
1950s crime comedy films
Italian crime comedy films
Films directed by Giorgio Simonelli
Films scored by Carlo Rustichelli
1959 comedy films
1950s Italian films